Udaya may refer to
 Udaya Pictures,  a movie company in Kerala.
 Udaya TV, a Kannada-language television channel 
 Udaya Manikya, a 16th-century king of Tripura.